Religious ecstasy is a type of altered state of consciousness characterized by greatly reduced external awareness and reportedly expanded interior mental and spiritual awareness, frequently accompanied by visions and emotional (and sometimes physical) euphoria.

Although the experience is usually brief in time, there are records of such experiences lasting several days or even more, and of recurring experiences of ecstasy during one's lifetime.

In Sufism, the term is referred to as wajad and the experience is referred to as either jazbah (jadbah o jedbah for Maghreb) or majzoobiyat.

Context 

The adjective "religious" means that the experience occurs in connection with religious activities or is interpreted in context of a religion. Journalist Marghanita Laski writes in her study "Ecstasy in Religious and Secular Experiences", first published in 1961:
"Epithets are very often applied to mystical experiences including ecstasies without, apparently, any clear idea about the distinctions that are being made. Thus we find experiences given such names as nature, religious, aesthetic, neo-platonic, etc.. experiences, where in some cases the name seems to derive from a trigger, sometimes from the over belief.

History

Ancient 
Yoga provides techniques to attain an ecstasy state called samādhi. According to practitioners, there are various stages of ecstasy, the highest being Nirvikalpa Samadhi. Bhakti Yoga especially, places emphasis on ecstasy as being one of the fruits of its practice.

In Buddhism, especially in the Pali Canon, there are eight states of trance also called absorption. The first four states are Rupa or, materially-oriented. The next four are Arupa or non-material. These eight states are preliminary trances which lead up to final saturation. In Visuddhimagga, great effort and years of sustained meditation are practiced to reach the first absorption, and not all individuals are able to accomplish it at all.

In the Dionysian Mysteries of ancient Greece, initiates used intoxicants, ecstatic dance and music to remove inhibitions and social constraints.

Modern 
Modern meditator experiences in the Thai Forest Tradition, as well as other Theravadan traditions, demonstrates that this effort and rarity is necessary only to become completely immersed in the absorptions and experience no other sensations. It is possible to experience the absorptions in a less intense state with much less practice.

In the monotheistic tradition, ecstasy is usually associated with communion and oneness with God. However, such experiences can also be personal mystical experiences with no significance to anyone but the person experiencing them. Some charismatic Christians practice ecstatic states (such as "being slain in the Spirit") and interpret these as given by the Holy Spirit. The firewalkers of Greece dance themselves into a state of ecstasy at the annual Anastenaria, when they believe themselves under the influence of Saint Constantine.

Historically, large groups of individuals have experienced religious ecstasies during periods of Christian revivals, to the point of causing controversy as to the origin and nature of these experiences. In response to claims that all emotional expressions of religious ecstasy were attacks on order and theological soundness from the Devil, Jonathan Edwards published his influential Treatise on Religious Affections. Here, he argues, religious ecstasy could come from oneself, the Devil, or God, and it was only by observing the fruit, or changes in inner thought and behaviour, that one could determine if the religious ecstasy had come from God.

In modern Pentecostal, charismatic and spirit-filled Christianity, numerous examples of religious ecstasy have transpired, similar to historic revivals. These occurrences however, have changed significantly since the time of the Toronto Blessing phenomena and several other North American so-called revivals and outpourings from the mid 1990s. From that time, religious ecstasy in these movements has been characterized by increasingly unusual behaviors that are understood by adherents to be the anointing of the holy spirit and evidence of God's "doing a new work". One of the most controversial and strange examples is that of spiritual birthing a practice during which women, and at times even men, claim to be having actual contractions of the womb while they moan and retch as though experiencing childbirth. It is said to be a prophetic action bringing spiritual blessings from God into the world. Many believe spiritual birthing to be highly demonic in nature and more occult-like than Christian. Religious ecstasy in these Christian movements has also been witnessed in the form of squealing, shrieking, an inability to stand or sit, uttering apocalyptic prophecies, holy laughter, crying and barking. Some people have made dramatic claims of sighting "gold dust", "angel feathers", "holy clouds", or the spontaneous appearance of precious gem stones during ecstatic worship events. Others have claimed to have received spontaneous gold tooth fillings. The Range Christian Fellowship in the conservative Australian city of Toowoomba demonstrates such displays of religious ecstasy on an almost weekly basis. In addition to all the above, worshippers there also use textile banners and during moments of religious ecstasy believe these banners carry special powers of "anointing" as a result of divinely inspired artwork.

In hagiography (writings about Christian saints) many instances are recorded in which saints are granted ecstasies. According to the Catholic Encyclopedia religious ecstasy (called "supernatural ecstasy") includes two elements: one, interior and invisible, in which the mind rivets its attention on a religious subject, and another, corporeal and visible, in which the activity of the senses is suspended, reducing the effect of external sensations upon the subject and rendering him or her resistant to awakening. The witnesses of a Marian apparition often describe experiencing these elements of ecstasy.

Modern Witchcraft traditions may define themselves as "ecstatic traditions", and focus on reaching ecstatic states in their rituals. The Reclaiming Tradition and the Feri Tradition are two modern ecstatic Witchcraft examples.

As described by the Indian spiritual teacher Meher Baba, God-intoxicated souls known in Sufism as masts experience a unique type of spiritual ecstasy: "[M]asts are desperately in love with Godor consumed by their love for God. Masts do not suffer from what may be called a disease. They are in a state of mental disorder because their minds are overcome by such intense spiritual energies that are far too much for them, forcing them to lose contact with the world, shed normal human habits and customs, and civilized society and live in a state of spiritual splendor but physical squalor. They are overcome by an agonizing love for God and are drowned in their ecstasy. Only the divine love embodied in a Perfect Master can reach them."

See also 
Altered state of consciousness
Divine madness (religion)
Ecstasy (philosophy)
Ecstasy (emotion)
Enlightenment (spiritual)
Entheogen
Eroto-comatose lucidity
Higher consciousness
Mast (Sufism)
Mysticism
Neurotheology
Numinous
Religious experience
Self-transcendence
Soul flight

Notable individuals or movements 
Montanism, a prophetic Christian sect of the 2nd century, founded by Montanus and two female colleagues, Prisca (or Priscilla) and Maximilla, who attained ecstatic visions through fasting and prayer.
Alexander Scriabin, late 19th century Russian composer and pianist who intended his music to induce religious ecstasy.
Anastenaria
Thomas Aquinas experienced an ecstasy during a church-service towards the end of his life that caused him to stop writing.
Dionysos/Bacchus, ancient Greek and Roman god of religious ecstasy, ritual madness, and wine among many other things.
Teresa of Avila, Roman Catholic mystic, first entered states of ecstasy while studying religious texts when taken ill in a Carmelite cloister.
Hildegard of Bingen, Benedictine abbess and mystic.
Caitanya Mahaprabhu, founder of Gaudiya Vaishnavism, immersed into deeper and deeper stages of ecstasy towards Krishna during the last 24 years of his life.
Pio of Pietrelcina
Joseph of Cupertino
Maulanah Rumi, mystic poet
Hafez, mystic poet
Moinuddin Chishti, Sufi saint
Amir Khusrow, mystic poet
Marguerite Porete, Beguine and Christian scholar, burned at the stake for her writings.
Simone Weil, 20th century French philosopher and Christian mystic.

References 

Charismatic and Pentecostal Christianity
Religious practices
Spirituality

ja:エクスタシー